The 2007–08 LNAH season was the 12th season of the Ligue Nord-Américaine de Hockey (before 2004 the Quebec Semi-Pro Hockey League), a minor professional league in the Canadian province of Quebec. Eight teams participated in the regular season, and Caron & Guay de Trois-Rivieres won the league title.

Regular season

Coupe Futura-Playoffs 
Won by Caron & Guay de Trois-Rivières

External links 
 Statistics on hockeydb.com

LNAH
3